Diglossa may refer to:

 Diglossia, where two dialects or languages are used (in fairly strict compartmentalization and of different status) by a single language community
 Diglossa (bird), a flowerpiercer genus